The 2012–13 Mohun Bagan A.C. season is the 123rd season of Mohun Bagan A.C. since the club's formation in 1889 and their 16th season in the I-League which is India's top football league. The team finished runners-up in the Calcutta Football League and a dismal tenth in the I-League. They were crowned Champions in the Airlines Cup after Mohammedan refused to play the finals and gave a walkover. Mohun Bagan crashed out in the group stage of the Federation Cup and were defeated by arch rivals East Bengal in the semi finals of the IFA Shield.

On 29 December 2012, Mohun Bagan were barred from competing in the I-League for 2 years following a decision taken by the I-League core committee. All their results in the I-League were declared null and void and all their remaining fixtures were cancelled. The suspension came because Mohun Bagan had refused to take the field in the second half of the match against East Bengal on 9 December 2012, citing crowd violence and unsuitable atmosphere for the continuation of the match.
However, on 15 January 2013, Mohun Bagan appealed against the decision to ban them from the I-League and were reinstated, but were fined a hefty amount, there officials were suspended from all AIFF meetings for one year and the team would start on 0 points and would play out only the remaining 16 fixtures in the league. This however, did not affect their win–loss and goal difference record in the table.

Transfers

In

Pre-season

Mid-season

Out

Pre-season

Mid-season

Kits
Supplier: Shiv Naresh / Sponsors: McDowell's No.1

Squad

First-team Squad

{|class="wikitable" style="text-align:center; font-size:90%; width:80%;"
|-
!style="background:#7A1024; color:white; text-align:center;"|Name
!style="background:#1A5026; color:white; text-align:center;"|Nationality
!style="background:#7A1024; color:white; text-align:center;"|Position
!style="background:#1A5026; color:white; text-align:center;"|Date of Birth (Age)
|-
!colspan=5 style="background:#7a1024; color:white; text-align:center;"|Goalkeepers
|-
|Arindam Bhattacharya
|
|GK
|
|-
|Milton Bhowmick
|
|GK
|—
|-
|Naveen Kumar
|
|GK
|
|-
|Shilton Pal (vice-captain)
|
|GK
|
|-
|Sudipta Banerjee
|
|GK
|
|-
!colspan=5 style="background:#1A5026; color:white; text-align:center;"|Defenders
|-
|Aiborlang Khongjee
|
|DF
|
|-
|Biswajit Saha
|
|DF
|
|-
|Deepak Sumanth
|
|DF
|
|-
|Echezona Anyichie
|
|DF
|
|-
|Khelemba Singh
|
|DF
|
|-
|Lalrozama Fanai
|
|DF
|
|-
|Mehrajuddin Wadoo
|
|DF
|
|-
|Mohan Sarkar
|
|DF
|—
|-
|Nirmal Chettri
|
|DF
|
|-
|Rajib Ghosh
|
|DF
|
|-
|Sourav Chakraborty
|
|DF
|
|-
|Warundeep Singh
|
|DF
|
|-
!colspan=5 style="background:#7a1024; color:white; text-align:center;"|Midfielders
|-
|Arjun Chatterjee
|
|MF
|—
|-
|Bijendra Rai
|
|MF
|
|-
|Denson Devadas
|
|MF
|
|-
|Jewel Raja
|
|MF
|
|-
|Lalrin Fela
|
|MF
|
|-
|Manish Bhargav
|
|MF
|
|-
|Manish Maithani
|
|MF
|
|-
|Nirapada Mondal
|
|MF
|—
|-
|Quinton Jacobs
|
|MF
|
|-
|Rakesh Masih
|
|MF
|
|-
|Snehasish Chakraborty
|
|MF
|
|-
|Sushanth Mathew
|
|MF
|
|-
|Syed Rahim Nabi
|
|MF
|
|-
!colspan=5 style="background:#1A5026; color:white; text-align:center;"|Forwards
|-
|Anil Kumar
|
|FW
|
|-
|Chinadorai Sabeeth
|
|FW
|
|-
|Dipendu Biswas
|
|FW
|
|-
|Odafa Onyeka Okolie (captain)
|
|FW
|
|-
|Tolgay Ozbey
|
|FW
|
|-

Technical staff
{| class="wikitable"
|-
! Position
! Name
|-
|rowspan=3|Chief coach
| Santosh Kashyap
|-
| Mridul Banerjee
|-
| Karim Bencherifa
|-
| Assistant coach
| Bernard Oparanozie
|-
| Goalkeeping coach
| Hemanta Dora
|-
| Fitness coach
| Joseph Ronald D'Angelus
|-
| Physiotherapist
| Jonathan Corner
|-
| Team manager
| Debasish Dutta

Statistics

Calcutta Football League stats

Last Updated: 23 May 2013Source: Statistics

Goal scorers
{|class="wikitable" style="text-align:center; font-size:95%"
|-
!Pos.
!Nat.
!Name
!Goal(s)
!Appearance(s)
|-
|FW||
|Odafa Onyeka Okolie
|16||10
|-
|FW||
|Tolgay Özbey
|6||11
|-
|FW||
|Chinadorai Sabeeth
|5||11
|-
|FW||
|Anil Kumar
|2||2
|-
|FW||
|Stanley Okoroigwe
|2||4
|-
|DF||
|Nirmal Chettri
|2||5
|-
|MF||
|Manish Bhargav
|2||13
|-
|MF||
|Syed Rahim Nabi
|1||3
|-
|MF||
|Quinton Jacobs
|1||7
|-
|MF||
|Snehasish Chakraborty
|1||9
|-
|MF||
|Manish Maithani
|1||10
|-
|DF||
|Aiborlang Khongjee
|1||10
|-
|MF||
|Rakesh Masih
|1||11
|-
|DF||
|Mehrajuddin Wadoo
|1||12
|- bgcolor=#efefef
!colspan=3 scope="col"|TOTAL
!scope="col"|
!scope="col"|

Disciplinary record
{|class="wikitable" style="text-align:center; font-size:95%;"
!Pos.
!Nat.
!Player
!!!!!
!Notes
|-
|MF
|
|Quinton Jacobs
|0||0||1
|Missed Match: vs East Bengal(23 May 2013)
|-
|DF
|
|Sourav Chakraborty
|0||1||0
|Missed Match: vs Police A.C.(26 December 2012)
|-
|MF
|
|Denson Devadas
|2||0||0
|
|-
|MF
|
|Manish Bhargav
|2||0||0
|Missed Match: vs Bhawanipore(12 February 2013)
|-
|DF
|
|Nirmal Chettri
|2||0||0
|
|-
|DF
|
|Aiborlang Khongjee
|2||0||0
|
|-
|FW
|
|Odafa Onyeka Okolie
|1||0||0
|
|-
|FW
|
|Tolgay Özbey
|1||0||0
|
|-
|MF
|
|Jewel Raja
|1||0||0
|
|-
|DF
|
|Echezona Anyichie
|1||0||0
|
|-
|GK
|
|Shilton Pal
|1||0||0
|
|-
|GK
|
|Arindam Bhattacharya
|1||0||0
|
|-

Airlines Cup stats

Last Updated: 2 November 2012Source: Statistics

Goal scorers
{|class="wikitable" style="text-align:center; font-size:95%"
|-
!Pos.
!Nat.
!Name
!Goal(s)
!Appearance(s)
|-
|FW||
|Tolgay Özbey
|2||1
|-
|MF||
|Jewel Raja
|1||1
|- bgcolor=#efefef
!colspan=3 scope="col"|TOTAL
!scope="col"|
!scope="col"|

Disciplinary record
{|class="wikitable" style="text-align:center; font-size:95%;"
!Pos.
!Nat.
!Player
!!!!!
!Notes
|-
|DF
|
|Echezona Anyichie
|1||0||0
|
|-

Federation cup stats

Last Updated: 24 September 2012Source: Statistics

Goal scorers
{|class="wikitable" style="text-align:center; font-size:95%"
|-
!Pos.
!Nat.
!Name
!Goal(s)
!Appearance(s)
|-
|FW||
|Chinadorai Sabeeth
|1||3
|-
|MF||
|Manish Maithani
|1||2
|- bgcolor=#efefef
!colspan=3 scope="col"|TOTAL
!scope="col"|
!scope="col"|

Disciplinary record
{|class="wikitable" style="text-align:center; font-size:95%;"
!Pos.
!Nat.
!Player
!!!!!
!Notes
|-
|DF
|
|Echezona Anyichie
|2||0||0
|
|-
|FW
|
|Tolgay Özbey
|1||0||0
|
|-
|DF
|
|Khelemba Singh
|1||0||0
|
|-

I-League stats

Last Updated: 12 May 2013Source: Statistics

Goal scorers
{|class="wikitable" style="text-align:center; font-size:95%"
|-
!Pos.
!Nat.
!Name
!Goal(s)
!Appearance(s)
|-
|FW||
|Odafa Onyeka Okolie
|19||22
|-
|FW||
|Tolgay Özbey
|10||17
|-
|MF||
|Denson Devadas
|2||25
|-
|FW||
|Stanley Okoroigwe
|1||11
|-
|MF||
|Quinton Jacobs
|1||13
|-
|FW||
|Chinadorai Sabeeth
|1||16
|-
|MF||
|Jewel Raja
|1||18
|-
|MF||
|Manish Maithani
|1||18
|-
|MF||
|Syed Rahim Nabi
|1||23
|-
|DF||
|Aiborlang Khongjee
|1||24
|-
|DF||
|Nirmal Chettri
|1||25
|- bgcolor=#efefef
!colspan=3 scope="col"|TOTAL
!scope="col"|
!scope="col"|

Disciplinary record
{|class="wikitable" style="text-align:center; font-size:95%;"
!Pos.
!Nat.
!Player
!!!!!
!Notes
|-
|FW
|
|Odafa Onyeka Okolie
|0||0||1
|Missed Match: vs Salgaocar(20 January 2013)Missed Match: vs United Sikkim(24 January 2013)Missed Match: vs Prayag United(27 January 2013)
|-
|DF
|
|Echezona Anyichie
|5||1||0
|Missed Match: vs Sporting Goa(7 April 2013)Missed Match: vs Churchill Brothers(21 April 2013)
|-
|DF
|
|Biswajit Saha
|1||1||0
|Missed Match: vs Pune(2 December 2012)
|-
|MF
|
|Denson Devadas
|7||0||0
|Missed Match: vs Shillong Lajong(28 March 2013)
|-
|DF
|
|Aiborlang Khongjee
|6||0||0
|Missed Match: vs Mumbai(10 April 2013)
|-
|DF
|
|Nirmal Chettri
|4||0||0
|Missed Match: vs Pailan Arrows(24 March 2013)
|-
|FW
|
|Chinadorai Sabeeth
|2||0||0
|
|-
|MF
|
|Syed Rahim Nabi
|2||0||0
|
|-
|GK
|
|Shilton Pal
|2||0||0
|
|-
|FW
|
|Tolgay Özbey
|1||0||0
|
|-
|FW
|
|Stanley Okoroigwe
|1||0||0
|
|-
|MF
|
|Snehasish Chakraborty
|1||0||0
|
|-
|MF
|
|Jewel Raja
|1||0||0
|
|-
|MF
|
|Manish Maithani
|1||0||0
|
|-
|MF
|
|Manish Bhargav
|1||0||0
|
|-
|MF
|
|Lalrin Fela
|1||0||0
|
|-
|MF
|
|Quinton Jacobs
|1||0||0
|
|-
|DF
|
|Mehrajuddin Wadoo
|1||0||0
|
|-

IFA Shield stats

Last Updated: 17 March 2013Source: Statistics

Goal scorers
{|class="wikitable" style="text-align:center; font-size:95%"
|-
!Pos.
!Nat.
!Name
!Goal(s)
!Appearance(s)
|-
|FW||
|Odafa Onyeka Okolie
|6||4
|-
|FW||
|Chinadorai Sabeeth
|3||3
|-
|MF||
|Denson Devadas
|1||4
|- bgcolor=#efefef
!colspan=3 scope="col"|TOTAL
!scope="col"|
!scope="col"|

Disciplinary record

Federation Cup

Group stage (group B)

I-League

IFA Shield

Group stage (group B)

Semi finals

Results summary

Matches

Calcutta Football League (group stage)

Calcutta Football League (championship stage)

Airlines Cup

Federation Cup

I-League

IFA Shield

Notes

References

Mohun Bagan AC seasons
Mohun Bagan